The 1941 Illinois State Normal Redbirds football team represented Illinois State Normal University—now known as Illinois State University—as a member of the Illinois Intercollegiate Athletic Conference (IIAC) during the 1941 college football season. Led by 11th-year head coach Howard Hancock, the Redbirds compiled an overall record of 3–4–2 with a mark of 3–1 in conference play, sharing the IIAC title with Northern Illinois State. Illinois State Normal played home games at McCormick Field in Normal, Illinois.

Schedule

References

Illinois State Normal
Illinois State Redbirds football seasons
Interstate Intercollegiate Athletic Conference football champion seasons
Illinois State Normal Redbirds football